Twin Township may refer to:

 Twin Township, Darke County, Ohio
 Twin Township, Preble County, Ohio
 Twin Township, Ross County, Ohio

Township name disambiguation pages